Rob Campbell is an actor in stage, television and films.

A graduate of Wesleyan University and the Yale School of Drama, Campbell performed in numerous Yale Repertory Theatre productions including The Winter's Tale alongside actress  Lupita Nyong'o. On Broadway, he appeared as Lvov in Ivanov (with Kevin Kline), as Governor George Wallace in All the Way (with Bryan Cranston), and as Manus in Translations (with Brian Dennehy). He also has performed at many theatres in New York (NYC's Public Theater, Lincoln Center, Playwrights Horizons, Classic Stage Company, Manhattan Theatre Club), in London, and across the country (Steppenwolf Theatre Company, Goodman Theatre, Williamstown Theatre Festival, etc.).

Campbell made his screen debut in Clint Eastwood's Unforgiven.

Campbell is married to actress Ana Reeder and they have one son together.

Filmography 
Unforgiven (1992) as Davey Bunting
Ethan Frome (1993) as Young Ned
The Stars Fell on Henrietta (1995) as Kid
Lone Justice 2 (1995) as Roby
The Crucible (1996) as Reverend Hale
Hostile Waters (1997) as Sergei Preminin
Boys Don't Cry (1999) as Brian
The Photographer (2000) as Romeo
Hedwig and the Angry Inch (2001) as Krzysztof
City of Ghosts (2003) as Simon
Dark Matter (2007) as Small
Admission (2013) as Richard
Winter's Tale (2014) as Gwathmi
Middleground (2017) as Bartender

TV series appearances
Sex and the City
The Cheating Curve (1999), as Ethan Watson
Law & Order
"Shangri-La" (2002), as Mr. Gary 'Boz' Bergan
Law & Order: Criminal Intent
 The Posthumous Collection (2004), as Daniel Heltman
Hope & Faith, 1 episode, 2004
Almost Paradise (2004) TV episode .... Donnie Fuller
Brotherhood (2006), as Carl Hobbs
The Crossing (2018), as Paul

References

External links 
 
 
 

American male stage actors
American male film actors
American male television actors
Year of birth missing (living people)
Living people
Wesleyan University alumni
Yale School of Drama alumni
Place of birth missing (living people)